Giovanni Angelo Scinzenzeler was a printer in Milan from 1477 to 1526. He published more than 200 books.

Biography
Scinzenzeler began his career under the apprenticeship of his father, Ulrich Scinzenzeler.  Giovanni has been described as "the most prolific of the Milanese printers in the early 1500s".

His printer's mark was an angel within a rectangle, holding a disc. There are initials at the feet of the angel, and the words "IO IACOMO E FRAT DE LAGNANO" circumscribing a blazing sun, in the middle of which is a monogram, I.H.S., under a cross.  This mark has also been attributed to one Zanotto from Castelliono.

Giovanni Angelo Scinzenzeler printed four editions of The Imitation of Christ, in 1500, 1504, 1511 and 1519 (his father Giovanni had published one in 1489).

References

Further reading
 Amaldo Ganda, Giovanni Angelo Scinzenzeler: il testamento e altri documenti inediti (Milano 1499-1503), in L'organizzazione del supere: Studi in onore di Alfredo Serrai, ed. Maria Teresa Biagetti, 2004

Italian printers
15th-century printers
16th-century printers
15th-century births
16th-century deaths
15th-century Italian businesspeople
16th-century Italian businesspeople